The Man Who Sold Himself is a 1959 West German crime film directed by Josef von Báky and starring Hildegard Knef, Hansjörg Felmy and Antje Weisgerber.

It was shot at the Wandsbek Studios in Hamburg. The film's sets were designed by the art directors Erich Kettelhut and Johannes Ott.

Cast

References

Bibliography 
 Bock, Hans-Michael & Bergfelder, Tim. The Concise CineGraph. Encyclopedia of German Cinema. Berghahn Books, 2009.

External links 
 

1959 films
1959 crime films
German crime films
West German films
1950s German-language films
Films directed by Josef von Báky
Films about journalists
Films shot at Wandsbek Studios
1950s German films